These are the results of the men's K-2 10000 metres competition in canoeing at the 1936 Summer Olympics.  The K-2 event is raced by two-man canoe sprint kayaks, and took place on Friday, August 7.

Twenty-four canoeists from twelve nations competed.

Medalists

Final
Friday, August 7, 1936: Only a final was held.

References
1936 Summer Olympics Official Report Volume 2. p. 1028.
Sports reference.com 1936 K-2 10000 m results

Men's K-2 10000